Warriors Five is a 1962 black and white Italian-French-Yugoslavian international co-production war film directed by Leopoldo Savona and starring Jack Palance, Giovanna Ralli, and Serge Reggiani. It is set during World War II. It was released in the US by American International Pictures as a double feature with Samson and the Seven Miracles of the World.

Plot summary

In German-occupied Italy during World War II, American paratrooper Jack (Jack Palance) lands behind enemy lines and begins an espionage assignment. He ends up captured and imprisoned. With four Italian POWs, he manages to escape. He then talks them into helping him blow up a strategically important bridge. Mayhem ensues until the only people left are the hero and Italia (Giovanna Ralli), a lovely Italian hooker.

Cast

 Jack Palance as Jack
 Giovanna Ralli as Italia
 Serge Reggiani as Libero
 Folco Lulli as Marzi
 Venantino Venantini as Alberto
 Franco Balducci as Conti
 Miha Baloh as Sansone
 Vera Murko as Mafalda 
 Bruno Scipioni as Angelino

References

External links 
 
 
 
 

1962 films
American black-and-white films
American International Pictures films
Italian Campaign of World War II films
Films with screenplays by Ugo Pirro
Macaroni Combat films
Films scored by Ronald Stein
English-language Italian films
1960s English-language films
1960s Italian films